Bakar Bata was a state constituency in Kedah, Malaysia, that had been represented in the Kedah State Legislative Assembly.

History 
It was abolished in 2018 when it was redistributed.

Representation history

Election results

References 

Constituencies established in 2003
Constituencies disestablished in 2018
Defunct Kedah state constituencies